is a monorail station on the Osaka Monorail located in Ibaraki, Osaka, Japan. It is the terminus of the line. The station is located near Osaka University Minoh Campus.

Lines
Osaka Monorail Saito Line (Station Number: 54)

History
March 19, 2007 – Station begins operation as the Saito Line extension from Handai-byoin-mae to Saito-nishi opens

Layout
There is an island platform with two tracks.

Adjacent stations

	

Ibaraki, Osaka
Osaka Monorail stations
Railway stations in Japan opened in 2007
Osaka University transportation